Playaz of da Game is a compilation album by American rapper Juvenile featuring DJ Jimi. It was released on September 26, 2000, via D3 Entertainment, and is compiled of Juvenile's songs recorded before he was signed with Ca$h Money Records. The album peaked at #78 on the Billboard Top R&B/Hip-Hop Albums and #21 on the Independent Albums charts in the United States.

The song "Got It Going On" was listed in Vibe magazine as one of, if not the most, uses of the word "nigga" in one song. The tally totals 416 mentions.

Track listing

Notes
Tracks 1, 2, 4, 5, 8 and 11 originally appeared on D.J. Jimi's 1994 album I'm Back! I'm Back! for Gamtown Records Inc.
Tracks 3, 6, 9 and 12 originally appeared on D.J. Jimi's 1992 album It's Jimi for Soulin' Records

Charts

References

External links

2000 compilation albums
Juvenile (rapper) albums